This is a list of scheduled year-round and seasonal destinations served by Dutch low-cost airline Transavia (formerly transavia.com) as of December 2020:

List

See also
List of Transavia France destinations
List of KLM destinations
List of KLM Cityhopper destinations
List of Air France destinations

References

Lists of airline destinations
Air France–KLM